John J. Bracken (February 11, 1908 – January 23, 1994) was an American politician who served as the Attorney General of Connecticut from 1955 to 1959.

He died on January 23, 1994, in Hartford, Connecticut at age 85.  To date, he is the last Republican Attorney General of the state.

References

1908 births
1994 deaths
Connecticut Attorneys General
Connecticut Republicans